Michael Bublé's Christmas in the City is an American television special, which aired on NBC on December 6, 2021. Hosted by Michael Bublé, the program featured musical performances of songs from Bublé's 2011 album Christmas to celebrate its tenth anniversary.

Performances

Appearances

Jimmy Fallon
Leon Bridges

Broadcast
to be added

References

External links

2021 television specials
Christmas television specials
Michael Bublé television specials
NBC television specials